Alex Frank Stivrins (born November 29, 1962) is a retired Latvian-American professional basketball player. He was a 6'8" (203 cm) 220 lb (100 kg) small forward.  Stivrins graduated from Lincoln East High School in 1980 and led East to three state basketball tournament appearances, where they won the state championship in 1978, qualified for state in 1979 and finished runner-up in 1980 in Class A, which is Nebraska's largest classification for high school athletics.  He was a two-time Super State and All-Nebraska selection his junior and senior years. He played collegiately at Creighton University and the University of Colorado from 1980 to 1985. He continued his career in the NBA.

Stivrins was selected by the Seattle SuperSonics with the 75th overall pick in the 4th round of the 1985 NBA Draft. He played with the Sonics, Phoenix Suns, LA Clippers, Milwaukee Bucks and Atlanta Hawks.

His father, ophthalmologist Dr. Kazimirs Stivriņš (1921—2008), a native of Izvalta in Latgale, Latvia fled the second Soviet occupation of Latvia to the United States after the Second World War. Stivrins is considered to be the first ethnic Latvian (and Latgalian) player in the NBA and played a game in 1992 against the first ever Latvian-born NBA player, Gundars Vētra.

References

External links
NBA stats @ basketball-reference.com

1962 births
Living people
American expatriate basketball people in France
American expatriate basketball people in Italy
American expatriate basketball people in Japan
American expatriate basketball people in Spain
American men's basketball players
American people of Latvian descent
Atlanta Hawks players
Basketball players from Nebraska
CB Breogán players
CB Canarias players
Colorado Buffaloes men's basketball players
Creighton Bluejays men's basketball players
Liga ACB players
Los Angeles Clippers players
Milwaukee Bucks players
Omaha Racers players
Phoenix Suns players
Seattle SuperSonics draft picks
Seattle SuperSonics players
Small forwards
Sportspeople from Lincoln, Nebraska
Tenerife AB players
Wyoming Wildcatters players